Live in NYC '97 is a live album by blues musician Johnny Winter, recorded at The Bottom Line in Manhattan. Additional recording took place at Studio 900, New York City.

Track listing
 "Hide Away" (Freddie King, Sonny Thompson) - 7:28
 Medley - 6:53
 "Sen-Sa-Shun"
 "Got My Mojo Working" (Freddie King, Sonny Thompson, Preston Foster)
 "She Likes to Boogie Real Low" (Frankie L. Sims, Joe Corona) - 6:39
 "Blackjack" (Ray Charles) - 8:21
 "Just a Little Bit" (John Thornton, Piney Brown, Ralph Bass, Earl Washington) - 5:10
 "The Sun Is Shining" (Jimmy Reed, Calvin Carter, Ewart Abner) - 6:14
 "The Sky Is Crying" (Elmore James) - 7:19
 "Johnny Guitar" (Johnny "Guitar" Watson, Johnny Winter) - 4:32
 "Drop the Bomb" (Snooks Eaglin) - 5:18

Personnel
Johnny Winter: guitar and vocals
Mark Epstein: bass and background vocals
Tom Compton: drums
Bottom Line Recording staff
Chris Andersen: engineer
Wes Naprstek: assistant engineer
George Fishler: assistant engineer
Studio 900 Recording staff
Joe Johnson: engineer
Paul Clements: assistant engineer
Miscellaneous staff
Dick Shurman: producer
Mixed by David Axelbaum, at Streeterville, Chicago

References

Johnny Winter albums
1998 live albums
Albums recorded at the Bottom Line
Virgin Records live albums
Live blues rock albums